The Luther Monument is a public artwork located at Luther Place Memorial Church in Washington, D.C., United States. The monument to Martin Luther, the theologian and Protestant Reformer, is a bronze full-length portrait. It is a copy of the statue created by Ernst Friedrich August Rietschel as part of the 1868 Luther Monument in Worms, Germany. The monument was originally surveyed as part of the Smithsonian's Save Outdoor Sculpture! survey in 1993.

Description
Martin Luther stands dressed in long robes with his proper right leg moving slightly forward. The sculpture, which shows an excommunicated Luther defending himself during his trial before the Diet of Worms in 1521, features Luther resting his proper right hand on top of a large Bible that he holds in his proper left hand. His hair curls around his face and he looks outwards, looking slightly upwards. The sculpture stands on a three-tiered granite base (H 168 in. x W. 138 in.) and is surrounded by sunflowers and overlooks Thomas Circle.

The back of the sculpture, near the base, is engraved: 

E. RIETSCHEL FACIT. GEGOSSEN LAUCHHAMMER 1884

In raised letters on the front of the base along with the founder's mark:

MARTIN LUTHER

Information
Martin Luther is cast from an original mold of a statue by Rietschel which is part of the Luther Monument, in Worms, Germany, a group of sculptures installed there in 1868. The version in Washington inspired the installation of eleven other castings across the United States. It was installed in 1884.

Condition
This sculpture was surveyed in 1993 for its condition and was decided that treatment was "urgent."

See also
 List of public art in Washington, D.C., Ward 2

References

External links

Martin Luther on dcMemorials.

1884 sculptures

Bronze sculptures in Washington, D.C.
Cultural depictions of Martin Luther
Monuments and memorials in Washington, D.C.
1884 establishments in Washington, D.C.
Sculptures of men in Washington, D.C.
Statues in Washington, D.C.
Outdoor sculptures in Washington, D.C.
Statues of writers
Logan Circle (Washington, D.C.)